David Wojahn (born 1953, in St. Paul, Minnesota) is a contemporary American poet who teaches poetry in the Department of English at Virginia Commonwealth University, and in the low residency MFA in Writing program at the Vermont College of Fine Arts. He has been the director of Virginia Commonwealth University's Creative Writing Program.

Career
He was educated at the University of Minnesota, and the University of Arizona.

Wojahn taught for many years at Indiana University. He has also taught at University of Alabama, University of Arkansas at Little Rock, University of Chicago, University of Houston, and University of New Orleans.  In 2003, he joined Virginia Commonwealth University in Richmond, Virginia. He also teaches at Vermont College of Fine Arts.

Poetry
Most of Wojahn's poetry is metrical although he also works in free verse, usually addressing political and social issues in American life. He often takes as his subjects moments of significance in popular culture, such as the assassination of John Lennon, the professional decline of Jim Morrison or the drowning of Brian Jones. He has said that he hopes his poetry is considered "activist."

The poet Richard Hugo selected Wojahn's first book, Icehouse Lights, as a winner of the Yale Series of Younger Poets prize. "David Wojahn's poems concern themselves with emotive basics: leaving home, watching those we love age and die, the inescapable drone of our mortality," Hugo wrote. "Yet as poems, they are far from usual. They help us welcome inside, again and again, the most personal of feelings."

Wojahn has gone on to publish seven more books of poetry, all with the University of Pittsburgh Press.  Wojahn has also edited a volume of poetry by his late wife, Lynda Hull, entitled The Only World (HarperPerennial, 1995), as well as her more recent Collected Poems (Graywolf, 2006).

Awards
 Bread Loaf Writers’ Conference
 writing residencies from the Yaddo, and McDowell colonies.
 1987-1988 Amy Lowell Poetry Travelling Scholarship
 Icehouse Lights, was chosen by Richard Hugo as a winner of the 1982 Yale Series of Younger Poets prize, winner of the Poetry Society of America's William Carlos Williams Book Award.
 Glassworks, awarded the Society of Midland Authors’ Award for best volume of poetry
 Interrogation Palace: New and Selected Poems 1982-2004, was one of three named finalists for the Pulitzer Prize, and winner of the O. B. Hardison, Jr. Poetry Prize from the Folger Shakespeare Library
 In April 2007, Wojahn was one of two finalists for the Pulitzer Prize for Interrogation Palace.
 2003 List of Guggenheim Fellowships awarded in 2003
 National Endowment for the Arts, Fellowship
 Illinois Arts Council award
 the Fine Arts Work Center in Provincetown, Fellowship
 William Carlos Williams Award
 Celia B. Wagner Award from the Poetry Society of America
 Vermont College's Crowley/Weingarten Award for Excellence in Teaching
 George Kent Prize from Poetry magazine
 three Pushcart Prizes.
 2008 he was named VCU's Outstanding Faculty Award Winner
 2008 Carole Weinstein Poetry Prize.
 2013 Poets' Prize

Works

Poetry Books

Essays

 From the Valley of Making: Essays on the Craft of Poetry. University of Michigan Press. 2015. .
 Strange Good Fortune (Arkansas, 2001)
 "The Language of My Former Heart" : The Memory-Narrative In Recent American Poetry (Published in Green Mountains Review 1988)

Edited
 
 Profile of Twentieth Century American Poetry, with Jack Myers (Southern Illinois University, 1991)

References

External links
"Good Evening, Beautiful Deep: on Tranströmer's Sorrow Gondola" at Blackbird: an online journal of literature and the arts v10n1
"Ochre" suite of poems at Blackbird: an online journal of literature and the arts v9n2
"'In All Them Time Henry Could Not Make Good'": Reintroducing John Berryman Blackbird: an online journal of literature and the arts v4n2
Interview with William Matthews by David Wojahn and James Harms on Blackbird: an online journal of literature and the arts v4n1
 Q&A at smartishplace.com
 "Dirge with Proofs," poem from Third Coast
 Index of Wojahn's contributions to Ploughshares

1953 births
Living people
American male poets
National Endowment for the Arts Fellows
Writers from Saint Paul, Minnesota
Poets from Minnesota
University of Alabama faculty
University of Arizona alumni
University of Chicago faculty
University of Houston faculty
University of Minnesota alumni
University of New Orleans faculty
Vermont College of Fine Arts faculty
Virginia Commonwealth University faculty
Yale Younger Poets winners